Edgardo Garrido (1888–1976) was a Chilean writer. He won the Chilean National Prize for Literature in 1972.

1888 births
1976 deaths
Chilean male writers
National Prize for Literature (Chile) winners